Changsin Station is a subway station on Line 6 of the Seoul Metropolitan Subway. This station is much closer to Hansung University than the Line 4 station named after it.

Station layout

Vicinity
Exit 1 : Changsin Elementary School
Exit 2 : Hansung University
Exit 3 : Dongshin Elementary School
Exit 4 : Sungin Park

References 

Seoul Metropolitan Subway stations
Metro stations in Jongno District
Railway stations opened in 2000